The 2022 Cazoo Premier League Darts was a darts tournament, organised by the Professional Darts Corporation – the eighteenth edition of the tournament. The event began on Thursday 3 February 2022, at the Motorpoint Arena in Cardiff, and finished with the play-offs, at the Mercedes-Benz Arena in Berlin on Monday 13 June 2022.

Jonny Clayton was the reigning champion after defeating José de Sousa 11–5 in the 2021 final, but he lost 10–4 to debutant Joe Cullen in the semi-finals.

Michael van Gerwen won a record-equalling sixth Premier League title by defeating Cullen 11–10 in the final, after Cullen missed a dart at double to win the title, which would have made him the third debutant in a row (after Glen Durrant and Clayton) to win the title at his first attempt.

On Night 3, Gerwyn Price hit nine-dart finishes in consecutive matches (in his semi-final against Michael van Gerwen and the final against James Wade), making him the second person in Premier League history to hit two nine-darters on the same night, after Phil Taylor, who did both of his in the 2010 Premier League Darts final against Wade.

This tournament also saw the beginning of the PDC's new partnership with Winmau as their dartboard supplier.

Format
On 14 January 2022, the PDC announced a new format for the Premier League. Instead of the previously used round robin format, the event consisted of an eight-person knockout bracket every night. Each of the seven matches was played over the best-of-11 legs. The players were guaranteed to meet each other once in the quarter-finals throughout the first seven weeks and once in the quarterfinals in weeks 9–15, with weeks 8 and 16 being drawn based on the league standings at that point. Players received two points per semi-final finish, three points per runner-up finish, and five points per final win.

Though it was assured that players meet each other only twice in the quarter-finals on regular nights (i.e. weeks 1–7 and 9–15), no other guarantees are made. So certain players were drawn onto the same semi-final branch more often than others. For example, while Price–Wright, van Gerwen–Anderson and Wade–Smith pairs were on the same branch only when they play each other in the quarter-finals, a Wright–Anderson and van Gerwen–Smith final was possible only twice on the regular 14 nights.

Following the regular phase, the top four players in the league table contested the two knockout semi-finals with 1st playing 4th and 2nd playing 3rd.

Venues
2022 saw the return of the Brighton Centre, which was last used as a Premier League venue in 2017.

Prize money 
The prize money for the 2022 tournament increased to £1 million, including a £10,000 bonus to each night's winner.

Players
Usually, the top four players in the PDC Order of Merit following the 2022 PDC World Darts Championship would be joined by six invited players, of which they would have been announced following the World Championship final. However, this year, following the announcement of the new format, it was announced that only 8 players will participate in 2022.

It was revealed that the new format would encompass eight players, each playing against each other in a knockout tournament each night. The winner of each night would receive an additional £10,000 towards their prize money. Those who make it out of the last 8 each receive 2 points, the runner-up will receive 3 points and the winner receives 5.

The full list of players was announced on 31 January 2022, with the Top 6 players on the PDC Order of Merit joined by the reigning Premier League champion Jonny Clayton, and debutant Joe Cullen, fresh from winning his first televised title at the Masters the previous evening.

This new format saw “Judgement Night” and relegation disappear from the league.

League stage

3 February – Night 1
 Motorpoint Arena Cardiff, Cardiff

10 February – Night 2
 M&S Bank Arena, Liverpool

17 February – Night 3
 SSE Arena, Belfast

3 March – Night 4
 Westpoint Arena, Exeter

10 March – Night 5
 Brighton Centre, Brighton

17 March – Night 6
 Motorpoint Arena Nottingham, Nottingham

24 March – Night 7
 Rotterdam Ahoy, Rotterdam

31 March – Night 8
 Utilita Arena Birmingham, Birmingham

First Direct Arena, Leeds

14 April – Night 10
 AO Arena, Manchester

21 April – Night 11
 P&J Live, Aberdeen

28 April – Night 12
 3Arena, Dublin

5 May – Night 13
 OVO Hydro, Glasgow

12 May – Night 14
 Utilita Arena Sheffield, Sheffield

19 May – Night 15
 The O2, London

26 May – Night 16
 Utilita Arena Newcastle, Newcastle

13 June – Play-offs

The top four players of the league stage contest in the play-offs to decide the champion of the Premier League.

 Mercedes-Benz Arena, Berlin

Table and streaks

Table
Five points are awarded for a night win, three points for the runner-up and two points for the semi-finalists. When players are tied on points, leg difference is used first as a tie-breaker, after that legs won against throw and then tournament average.

The top 4 players after 16 nights advance to the play-offs on 13 June.

Final Standings 

(C) Champion after the playoffs, (RU) Runner-up after the playoffs

Streaks

Positions by Week

References

External links

 Professional Darts Corporation, official website
 PDC Professional Darts Corporation, official website, Tournaments

2022
2022 in British sport
2022 in darts
2022 in Irish sport
2022 in Dutch sport
2022 in German sport